Shawna Rochelle Kimbrell is a Lieutenant Colonel in the United States Air Force, and the first female African-American fighter pilot in the history of that service. She flew the F-16 Fighting Falcon during combat missions in Operation Northern Watch. She is stationed at Nellis Air Force Base where she is a member of the 78th Attack Squadron and serves as an MQ-9 Pilot and Mission Commander.

Early life and education
Kimbrell was born in Lafayette, Indiana. The youngest of four children, her mother and father, Eve Blackman Ng A Qui and Dr. Norman Ng A Qui emigrated to the United States and became naturalized U.S. citizens by the time she was born. The family moved to Parker, Colorado, and it was there, while attending fourth grade, that Kimbrell decided to pursue a career as a fighter pilot. Kimbrell had her first flight lesson at age fourteen, before joining the Civil Air Patrol, and working at air shows, subsequently earning her private pilot's license. Following graduation from high school, Kimbrell attended the United States Air Force Academy, graduating in 1998 with a Bachelor of Science Degree in General Engineering. After graduation, she subsequently attended Undergraduate Pilot Training (UPT), and was designated a pilot in August 1999. Kimbrell also holds a Master of Business Administration from Touro University.

Career
Kimbrell received her commission in 1998 after graduating from the USAF Academy, later she attended Undergraduate Pilot Training at Laughlin AFB, TX and was awarded her pilot wings in August 1999. She then completed Introduction to Fighter Fundamentals training at Randolph AFB, TX in November 1999. In August 2000, she graduated from her initial F-16 training at Luke AFB, Arizona, becoming the first African American female fighter pilot in the USAF.

She was assigned to the 13th Fighter Squadron, Misawa, Japan for her first operational assignment. During this time she was deployed to Turkey and Saudi Arabia in support of Operation Northern and Southern Watch. Her flights in Operation Northern Watch marked her as the first female pilot to fly combat missions for Misawa's 35th Fighter Wing. Additionally, during Operation Northern Watch she became the first African American female pilot to employ ordnance in combat.

In July 2004, she graduated from the Joint Fire Control Course and was assigned to the 15th Air Support Operations Squadron. Later she deployed as the 2nd Brigade Air Liaison Officer in support of Operation Iraqi Freedom.
 
In June 2007, Kimbrell was assigned to the 31st Fighter Wing, Aviano AB Italy where she served as Assistant Director of Operations for the 555 Fighter Squadron.
 
In 2009, Kimbrell relocated to 6th Combat Training Squadron, Nellis AFB where she served as the Course Manager for the Air Liaison Officer Qualification Course and an instructor. From this assignment, she separated from active duty Air Force and transitioned to the Air Force Reserves in Oct 2013.
 
Beginning October 2013, Kimbrell serves as an MQ-9 Pilot and Mission Commander for the 78th Attack Squadron out of Creech Air Force Base, Nevada.

Personal life

Kimbrell currently resides in Las Vegas, Nevada with her husband and two sons.

Awards and decorations
 Air Medal with one device
 Meritorious Service Medal
 Aerial Achievement Medal
 Air Force Commendation Medal with one device
 Army Commendation Medal
 National Defense Service Medal
 Armed Forces Expeditionary Medal
 Iraq Campaign Medal
 Global War on Terrorism Service Medal
 Korean Defense Service Medal

References

1976 births
African-American female military personnel
American aviators
United States Air Force personnel of the Iraq War
American people of Guyanese descent
Living people
United States Air Force Academy alumni
United States Air Force officers
Recipients of the Air Medal
Women in the United States Air Force
Women in the Iraq War
American women aviators
People from Indiana
People from Parker, Colorado
African-American aviators
African-American women aviators
Aviators from Colorado
Naturalized citizens of the United States
21st-century American women
African-American United States Air Force personnel